This list of DNS record types is an overview of resource records (RRs) permissible in zone files of the Domain Name System (DNS). It also contains pseudo-RRs.

Resource records

Other types and pseudo-RRs
Other types of records simply provide some types of information (for example, an HINFO record gives a description of the type of computer/OS a host uses), or others return data used in experimental features. The "type" field is also used in the protocol for various operations.

Obsolete record types
Progress has rendered some of the originally defined record-types obsolete.
Of the records listed at IANA, some have limited use, for various reasons. Some are marked obsolete in the list, some are for very obscure services, some are for older versions of services, and some have special notes saying they are "not right".

References

Further reading
 
 

Domain Name System
Internet protocols